Asia Khattak is a Pakistani politician who has been a member of the Provincial Assembly of Khyber Pakhtunkhwa since August 2018.

Education
She has a master's degree in International Relations and a bachelor's degree in Law.

Political career
She was elected to the Provincial Assembly of Khyber Pakhtunkhwa as a candidate of Pakistan Tehreek-e-Insaf (PTI) on a reserved seat for women in 2018 Pakistani general election.

References

Living people
Pakistan Tehreek-e-Insaf MPAs (Khyber Pakhtunkhwa)
Politicians from Khyber Pakhtunkhwa
Women members of the Provincial Assembly of Khyber Pakhtunkhwa
Year of birth missing (living people)